Besla dheeradiloki is a species of sea snail, a marine gastropod mollusk in the family Pyramidellidae, the pyrams and their allies. The species is one of twelve known species within the Besla genus of gastropods.

Distribution
The species notably inhabits marine terrains throughout the northern Gulf of Thailand area.

References

External links
 To World Register of Marine Species

Pyramidellidae
Gastropods described in 2004